Pay-by-phone parking allows any driver parking in a fare required space the option to divert the expense to a credit card or to a mobile network operator via the use of a mobile phone, mobile application or computer, opposed to inserting cash into a parking meter or pay and display machine. SMS pay-by-phone parking was invented by young Croatian innovators and introduced by Vipnet. Since its introduction in Croatian capital Zagreb in 2001 under name M-parking, the number of registered users has steadily increased. By 2004, the Croatian M-parking scheme was the largest in Europe (with over 130,000 users). Today, pay-by-phone parking is used by millions of people all around the world.

How it works 
Pay-by-phone parking technology can be used in multiple ways: “start stop” and “start duration.” “Start stop” parking requires the driver to contact the pay-by-phone provider first when the driver initiates the parking session and then again when the driver wishes to terminate the session.  Alternatively, “start duration” requires the driver to only contact the pay-by-phone provider when the parking session is to be initiated, in which the driver dictates the amount of time the session will last. The driver can also add on additional time or extend the parking session if needed.

Most pay-by-phone solutions require pre-registration, including the need to provide either a credit card for parking charges or the use of a credit card to preload a prepaid account.  There are some exceptions.  For example, one provider allows new customers a one-time free parking opportunity without pre-registering, and then contacts the new customer by SMS (text) to invite him or her to register. The typical information required upon registration is data such as the mobile phone number(s) that the driver wishes to use to engage/disengage the parking session, license plate information of the vehicle(s) that the driver wishes to utilize and credit card information.

To activate a parking session, the driver must first arrive at a designated pay-by-phone parking area. In order for the service to be available, the operator of the parking space, whether a city or a private owner, must have contracted with the pay-by-phone service provider. But if the service is available it will be clearly marked on the street, meter, sign or space. Then the driver can either call the pay-by-phone service provider (via a toll free number) or use their mobile application.

For the “start stop” customer to complete a transaction, the driver must call the pay-by-phone service provider again or use their mobile application upon departure to stop their parking transaction.  The provider should quickly recognize that the user has an active parking session and with the customer's discretion the session will be closed immediately.

NFC technology development for pay-by-phone parking 
It's anticipated that mobile carriers will be making it easier for drivers to use near-field communications (NFC) technology enabled mobile phones to pay for parking.  Drivers use a downloaded app or call a toll-free number to start parking. Once this technology reaches critical mass among the phone carriers, there are a couple existing mobile payment providers that have mobile apps ready.  Using a mobile phone to pay for parking will be as simple as tapping a NFC embedded logo.

Pay-by-phone parking from the customer’s perspective  
From a customer's standpoint, pay-by-phone parking is more convenient and timely than standard methods of parking payment.  One of the reasons supporting this is that there is no need to have coins or any other type of currency readily available.  Also, data collection allows for customers to track their parking expenses.  Generally, pay-by-phone service providers will provide records for each account detailing the time and location for each parking session, as well as the accumulated expenses.  In addition, any driver within the vicinity of a pay-by-phone parking area may witness less road congestion.  Studies show that 28 to 45% of traffic congestion in urban areas is due to drivers looking for a place to park.  Pay-by-phone parking provides accurate data for parking providers such as peak times and most popular zones.  With this insight, providers are able to manage their spaces more efficiently and have the potential to provide solutions to adjust for times with high demand. With certain mobile payment providers, and at the discretion of the parking operator (e.g., local council), drivers can opt to receive a text message several minutes before their expiry of their parking session, enabling them to extend the session without returning to their car. Most operators impose a maximum extension period.

The customer generally must pay a transaction fee to the pay-by-phone provider in addition to the standard parking rate.

Pay-by-phone parking from the provider’s perspective 
From the parking provider's point of view, pay-by-phone parking offers an opportunity for reduced costs.  The costs are reduced because there is no need for expenses such as meter or machine maintenance, cash collection, and accounting.  Pay-by-phone parking also prevents people from “feeding the meter.” This is when drivers exceed the posted parking time restrictions and do not get caught because they continually keep their space paid for.  When people follow the time constraints, there are more spaces open for other drivers who wish to park.  Also, accurate data management provides additional resources for the parking provider.  Since transactions are submitted digitally, providers have access to information regarding each customer's parking sessions.  With this data, legal challenges and complaints can be significantly reduced and enforcement can be handled more accurately and efficiently.

Enforcement 
Since pay-by-phone parking has been put into operation, several new ways of enforcing parking violations have been created:
 Use of an internet browser
 The parking provider is given access to a web page which contains a list that includes all of the active parking sessions, each vehicle’s license plate information and the amount of time that each session has been active. There are options for a smart phone’s internet browser or software for the in-vehicle computers. Pro: simple setup, easy ramp-on. Con: complex operations, failure prone.
 Handheld computer
 These computers have the capability of scanning individual license plates in a similar fashion to which a barcode is read. Pro: convenient. Con: expensive.
 Drive-by scanners
 These scanners are mounted to an enforcement vehicle and use License Plate Recognition (LPR) technology which automatically scans each parked vehicle’s license plate and identifies the vehicles parking status. Pro: labor efficient. Con: expensive, unreliable.
 Automatic notification

Providers
Major providers include RingGo and PayByPhone.

See also 
 Parking meter
 Pay and display

References 

Parking
Croatian inventions